U.S. Highway 52 (US 52) is a  United States Numbered Highway in northeast Iowa. The route begins at the Dale Gardner Veterans Memorial Bridge over the Mississippi River between Sabula and Savanna, Illinois. From Sabula, it heads north along the Mississippi towards Bellevue and Dubuque. At Dubuque, US 52 briefly shares an expressway with US 61 and US 151 before joining the Southwest Arterial, another expressway diverting traffic around the southern edge of Dubuque.

West of Dubuque, the route concurrently follows the US 20 expressway before joining Iowa Highway 136 (Iowa 136) in Dyersville. At Luxemburg, it continues north towards Guttenberg. At Calmar, US 52 turns to the north towards Decorah. US 52 crosses into Minnesota north of Burr Oak.

Despite its even number, US 52 is signed as a north–south route. According to the layout of the U.S. Highway System, even-numbered routes are generally signed as east–west routes.

Route description
US 52 begins in Iowa with Iowa 64 on the Dale Gardner Veterans Memorial Bridge over the Mississippi River north of Sabula. After descending the bridge, the two routes turn to the south and travel along a narrow,  causeway through the Mississippi backwaters. The two routes pass through Sabula, a city known as Iowa's island city, and turn west crossing another causeway to the mainland. Upon rising from the river valley, US 52/Iowa 64 meets the northern end of US 67. Iowa 64 continues west with US 67, while US 52 turns north to follow the river.

Between Sabula and Bellevue, US 52 follows the course of the Mississippi River. The roadway gradually enters the Driftless Area, a region of the midwestern United States which escaped glaciation during the last glacial period. North of Green Island, where it crosses the Maquoketa River, US 52 follows the bluffs along the Mississippi River valley.

At Bellevue, US 52 runs along the city's riverfront and passes Lock and Dam No. 12, intersecting with the eastern terminus of Iowa 62. North of Bellevue, it turns to the northwest and rises  in elevation and then descends  at St. Donatus. North of St. Donatus, the highway travels  and enters the Dubuque area.

At the unincorporated community of Key West near Dubuque, US 52 north turns south in a wrong-way concurrency onto the expressway carrying US 61 south and US 151 south. There is an overpass carrying Military Road, then a dogbone interchange with North English Road. After passing through the roundabout of a half-dogbone/half-diamond interchange from the US 20 expressway at the end of the arterial, US 52 passes over the US 20 expressway and merges onto its westbound lanes. The Southwest Arterial is largely freeway in character, however neither of its termini are free-flow interchanges.

It follows this north-south route through New Vienna, passing near the Field of Dreams filming site, until the northern terminus of Iowa 136 in Luxemberg.

From Luxemburg, US 52 heads north towards Guttenberg. As it approaches the Mississippi River, the road reenters the Driftless Area. North of Guttenberg, US 52 rises out of the Mississippi valley and travels west and then northwest away from the river. North of Garnavillo, it intersects Iowa 128, which serves as a cutoff to Iowa 13 near Elkader.  later, it intersects Iowa 13 at its northern end.

 north of the Iowa 13 intersection, US 52 intersects US 18. Between this location and Calmar, US 52 runs parallel to the DME Railroad. The two highways travel together to the northwest for  through Monona and Postville. At Postville, US 18/US 52 intersect Iowa 51. On the west side of Postville, US 52 splits away from US 18 and heads to the northwest towards Calmar. At Calmar, US 52 turns to the north at an intersection which is also the eastern end of Iowa 24 and the northern end of Iowa 150. From Iowa 9, the route crosses the Upper Iowa River near the Luther College campus. It heads north past the unincorporated community of Burr Oak.  north of Burr Oak, US 52 crosses the state line into Minnesota.

History
US 52 was designated in Iowa in 1935, replacing US 55 from Iowa 117 near Sabula to the Minnesota state line north of Burr Oak. US 52 crossed the Mississippi River at the recently constructed Savanna–Sabula Bridge, which opened in 1932. The section of old  US 55 from Iowa 117 to Dubuque ran concurrently with US 67 until 1967 when US 67 was truncated back to the intersection with US 52 on Iowa 64.

From 1963 to 1967, rather than following its alignment from Dubuque direct to Luxemburg, US 52 was realigned to instead follow US 20 to Dyersville and then Iowa 136 to Luxemburg while the original alignment was being rebuilt. During this time, Iowa 136, which previously ended at US 52 in Luxemburg, was truncated back to US 20 at Dyersville, but it was redesignated along this segment after US 52 returned to its old alignment.

In the mid-1990s, US 52/US 61/US 151 in Dubuque was shifted onto a new expressway through downtown Dubuque, which means the three U.S. Highways no longer intersected US 20 directly. Iowa 946 was designated as a connector route to provide direct access to US 20 from the three U.S. Highways.

The alignment of US 52 from Dubuque direct to Luxemburg was a particularly curvy and dangerous section of the route. A study conducted by the Center for Transportation Research and Education at Iowa State University, found that between 2002 and 2006, over 240 accidents with six fatalities occurred on this alignment; the study supported this section's discontinuation as a U.S. Highway.

In April 2013, the City of Dubuque and surrounding jurisdictions proposed rerouting US 52 so that it would match the existing route from Clinton, Sabula and Bellevue, but now head south concurrent with US 61/US 151, bypassing Dubuque, rather than heading north, into Dubuque. Once reaching the proposed Southwest Arterial, US 52 would turn onto that new highway and at its end, share an alignment with US 20. US 52 and US 20 would continue on to Dyersville, then US 52 would split off and continue to Luxemburg. This new routing would be similar to US 52's alignment from 1963 to 1967. This new alignment of US 52 officially took place on August 17, 2020, with the completion of the Southwest Arterial.

A new Mississippi River crossing, the Dale Gardner Veterans Memorial Bridge, opened on November 17, 2017.

Major intersections

See also
Northwest Arterial

References

External links

 Iowa
52
Transportation in Dubuque, Iowa
052
Transportation in Jackson County, Iowa
Transportation in Dubuque County, Iowa
Transportation in Clayton County, Iowa
Transportation in Allamakee County, Iowa
Transportation in Winneshiek County, Iowa